The Palm Springs Aerial Tramway in Palm Springs, California, is the largest rotating aerial tramway in the world. It was opened in September 1963 as a way of getting from the floor of the Coachella Valley to near the top of San Jacinto Peak and was constructed in rugged Chino Canyon.  Before its construction, the only way to the top of the mountain was to hike hours from Idyllwild. The rotating cars were added in 2000.

Route

Travelers start in the Sonoran Desert and arrive at an alpine forest.

The floor of the  aerial tram cars rotates constantly, making two complete revolutions throughout the duration of the journey so that the passengers can see in all directions without moving.  With a maximum capacity of 80 passengers, it is the largest of the three rotating aerial trams in the world.  The other "Rotair" aerial trams are located in Cape Town, South Africa, Titlis, Switzerland and Sky Way,Courmayeur, Italy.

Passengers disembark at the 
Mountain Station in the alpine wilderness of Long Valley and Mount San Jacinto State Park. The air can be as much as 40 °F (22 °C) cooler at the top than in the desert. Visitors can walk along nature trails or play in the snow in the winter months. Back-country hiking can be done with a permit from the U.S. Forest Service. There are two restaurants at the summit, one of which specializes in fine dining. Both stations have gift shops specializing in Aerial Tramway-related merchandise as well as educational toys. A video presentation of the history of the attraction plays continuously in a theater at the Mountain Station. It was produced by Palm Springs television station KESQ-TV with voiceovers provided by Palm Springs radio personalities.

California's Salton Sea is plainly visible to the southeast.

As it was in 1963, the only way up the mountain to deliver supplies and water is via the aerial tram cars themselves. Supplies are loaded into the passenger area before the attraction's opening while fresh water is pumped into storage tanks in the car's underbelly.

The original aerial tram cars are now on static display near the entrance to the Valley Station.

History 

The aerial tram was first proposed by electrical engineer Francis F. Crocker during a 1935 trip to Banning, California, with the Desert Sun newspaper publisher Carl Barkow. During the heat of the day, Crocker's gaze fell upon the snow-capped,  peak of Mount San Jacinto to the east. Crocker then proposed building an aerial tram up the face of Chino Canyon, an idea that one newspaper dubbed "Crocker's Folly".

Toward the end of the decade, Crocker named the comanager of the Palm Springs Desert Inn, O. Earl Coffman, to chair the construction committee.

Both World War II and the Korean War shelved the project. Construction began in 1960. The unprecedented use of helicopters in the construction of four of the aerial tram's five towers helped the Palm Springs Aerial Tramway earn a reputation as a great engineering feat. It was opened in September 1963.

In 1963, a tram car became stuck for 13½ hours because of an electrical problem in the control room.

On September 16, 1967, the first episode of the TV show Mannix was broadcast with the tramway as a scene in the show. On October 2, 1971, an episode of Mission: Impossible (Season 6, Episode 3: "The Tram"), filmed at the tramway, first aired. In the fall of 1966, two episodes of I Spy were filmed in Palm Springs, one of which included footage of the tramway (Season 2, Episode 1), and the other included a brief discussion of the tramway (Season 2, Episode 8). The Columbo episode "Short Fuse" featured the tramway as the location of the climactic scene at the end of the show where Columbo tricks the murderer into revealing his guilt. The fourth and final Matt Helm movie, The Wrecking Crew, contained an action scene filmed at the tram station that featured actors Dean Martin, Nancy Kwan, and Sharon Tate. The 1974 television movie Skyway to Death, shown on the ABC Movie of the Week, had its exterior scenes filmed at the tramway. In the 2010 Life After People episode "Holiday Hell", the desert environment allows the tramway to survive 120 years without maintenance before it collapses into Chino Canyon from corrosion of its cables and towers.

In June 1984, a tram car was headed down the mountain when a bolt from a shock absorber snapped, causing a  piece of metal to crash through a Plexiglas window along the car's roof. Tram passenger Elaine Tseko of Ontario, California, was struck by the piece and later died as a result of the injury.

In September 1984, during routine maintenance, an auxiliary cable snapped and wrapped around the main cable tracks. The Desert Sun newspaper reported that if the broken cable hadn't wedged itself under the main track cables, a rescue car with the tram's workmen in it could have plummeted down the mountain into the lower tramway station. "Without the snag," a state investigator said, "those two men wouldn't be with us today."

In 1985, a flash flood buried vehicles parked in the Valley Station's parking lot in mud and tore up about three-quarters of a mile of Tramway Road. Stranded passengers had to be airlifted from the area.

Not all Tramway accidents happened on the passenger lifts. On July 31, 1991, a bus carrying approximately 60 Girl Scouts careened out of control as it was heading downhill on Tram Road, killing the driver and six passengers.

In 2000, the original tram cars were replaced by new cars that rotate slowly, offering riders a 360° panoramic view of Chino Canyon and the desert valley floor.

In October 2003, a steel cable broke and caused a mechanical failure that left more than fifty tramway customers hanging in mid-air and one hundred passengers stranded at the Mountain station for 4½ hours. During the crisis, tramway officials sought a rescue helicopter but could not locate one. The obstruction was removed by a tram operator with no training in maintenance, utilizing a borrowed Leatherman utility knife. The Desert Sun later reported that a cable inspector had discovered a break in the rescue line almost two hours before the incident occurred.

Animal park 
In the late 1960s, the Tramway Animal Park, now defunct, was owned and operated by Animal Behavior Laboratories of Los Angeles. A portion of the park included a fenced area for reindeer that were allowed to roam throughout Chino Canyon. In addition to reindeer, the park featured tame deer, cockatoos, two dolphins named Buttons and Beau, macaques, and various other species of primates (including "Suzie, the show-off chimpanzee"). The animals performed in regularly scheduled shows.

Station architecture 

Both tramway stations were designed by notable mid-century modern architects. The Valley Station, finished in 1963, was designed by Albert Frey and Robson C. Chambers. The Mountain Station, built in 1961, was designed by architect E. Stewart Williams. Additionally, the distinctive  Tramway Gas Station at the foot of Tramway Road was designed by Frey and Chambers.

Further reading

 
  (here for Table of Contents)
 
 Wheeler, George O. (1963). Geo. O. Wheeler's 50 tramway pictures. Palm Springs, CA: Wheeler's Desert Letter. pp. 63.

References

External links

 Official website
 Palm Springs tourism website page for Santa Rosa & San Jacinto Mountains
 Palm Springs Aerial Tramway: Miracle at Palm Springs, c. 1970 (video) 
 

1963 establishments in California
Aerial tramways in the United States
Albert Frey buildings
Aerial
E. Stewart Williams buildings
Modernist architecture in California
San Jacinto Mountains
Aerial
Transport infrastructure completed in 1963
Transport infrastructure completed in 2000
Transportation buildings and structures in California
Transportation buildings and structures in Riverside County, California